Pedro Iarley Lima Dantas or simply Iarley (born March 29, 1974 in Quixeramobim, Brazil) is a Brazilian retired footballer who played mainly as an attacking midfielder.

Club career
Iarley played for Ferroviário, Ceará, and Paysandu of Brazil, Real Madrid B, AD Ceuta and UD Melilla of Spain, Boca Juniors of Argentina and Dorados de Sinaloa of Mexico. He joined Internacional for the 2005 Campeonato Brasileiro from Dorados de Sinaloa, where he played during the 2004-2005 season.  Although Iarley impressed at Dorados in his first season, he also struggled with injuries, appearing in only nine games, registering three assists.

At Internacional, Iarley made a good impression at first, but then lost his place in the team that eventually won the Copa Libertadores in 2006 to wonderboy Rafael Sobis. After Sobis's transfer to Real Betis, he took on the number 10 shirt and helped Inter win the FIFA Club World Cup in the same year.

In 2008, he moved on to Goiás. And in 2009, he scored 12 goals in Série A and his team made a good season occupying the first positions despite of finishing in 9th.

In the end of 2009, Iarley signed a contract with Corinthians. In the end of 2010, he moved to fellow Série A team Ceará .

Iarley retired from football on August 22, 2014, after leaving his first club Ferroviário.

Honours

Club
Boca Juniors
Argentine Primera División: 2003 Apertura
Intercontinental Cup: 2003

Internacional
Copa Libertadores: 2006
FIFA Club World Cup: 2006
Recopa Sudamericana: 2007
Rio Grande do Sul State Championship: 2008

Goiás
Goiás State Championship: 2009, 2012
Campeonato Brasileiro Série B: 2012
Paysandu
Pará State Championship: 2013
Individual FIFA CLUB WORLD CUP SILVER BALL: 2006

References

External links

 pedroiarley

1974 births
Living people
Brazilian footballers
Brazilian expatriate footballers
Expatriate footballers in Argentina
Expatriate footballers in Mexico
Expatriate footballers in Spain
Real Madrid Castilla footballers
AD Ceuta footballers
UD Melilla footballers
Dorados de Sinaloa footballers
Boca Juniors footballers
Sport Club Internacional players
Ceará Sporting Club players
Goiás Esporte Clube players
Paysandu Sport Club players
Ferroviário Atlético Clube (CE) players
La Liga players
Segunda División B players
Campeonato Brasileiro Série A players
Campeonato Brasileiro Série B players
Argentine Primera División players
Liga MX players
Brazilian expatriate sportspeople in Argentina
Sport Club Corinthians Paulista players
Association football midfielders
Sportspeople from Ceará